Whitewater Township may refer to:

 Whitewater Township, Franklin County, Indiana
 Whitewater Township, Dubuque County, Iowa, in Dubuque County, Iowa
 Whitewater Township, Grand Traverse County, Michigan
 Whitewater Township, Winona County, Minnesota
 Whitewater Township, Bollinger County, Missouri
 Whitewater Township, Cape Girardeau County, Missouri
 Whitewater Township, Hamilton County, Ohio

Township name disambiguation pages